Paul and Pauline (German: Paul und Pauline) is a 1936 German comedy film directed by Heinz Paul and starring Ludwig Manfred Lommel, Trude Hesterberg and Erika Helmke. It was shot at the Terra Studios in Marienfelde in Berlin.

Synopsis
Paul Neugebauer has a scheme to transform his small town into a famous spa resort. To do so he plans to make a radio broadcast in order to boost the scheme, but a series of confusions unfold.

Cast
 Ludwig Manfred Lommel as Paul Neugebauer  
 Trude Hesterberg as Bertha Wohlleben  
 Erika Helmke as Karoline - ihre Tochter  
 Kurt Vespermann as Heinrich Zehnpfennig, Friseur  
 Hubert von Meyerinck as Apotheker Knullingen 
 Paul Westermeier as Warenhausbesitzer Großkopf  
 Paul Henckels as Bürgermeister Kleinmichel  
 Werner Stock as Gustav - sein Sohn  
 Walter Steinbeck as Bellermann - ein Spekulant 
 Ernst Behmer as Hermann - Faktotum  
 Leo Peukert 
 Erich Kestin 
 Erich Fiedler 
 Gaston Briese
 Carl Walther Meyer
 Karl Platen 
 Gerhard Dammann
 Willy Kaiser-Heyl 
 Walter von Allwoerden 
 Max Wilmsen 
 Hans Sternberg 
 Herbert Quandt
 Curt Bullerjahn 
 Ethel Reschke 
 Ulla Ronge

References

Bibliography 
 Bock, Hans-Michael & Bergfelder, Tim. The Concise CineGraph. Encyclopedia of German Cinema. Berghahn Books, 2009.
 Klaus, Ulrich J. Deutsche Tonfilme: Jahrgang 1936. Klaus-Archiv, 1988.

External links 
 

1936 films
1936 comedy films
Films of Nazi Germany
1930s German-language films
Films directed by Heinz Paul
Terra Film films
German comedy films
German black-and-white films
1930s German films
Films shot at Terra Studios